Woodrow is an unincorporated community that lies south of Paw Paw along West Virginia Route 9 in both Hampshire and Morgan Counties in West Virginia's Eastern Panhandle. Woodrow lies on the eastern flanks of Spring Gap Mountain with Sideling Hill to its east. Woodrow Union Church has served the community since the late 19th century.

References

External links 

Unincorporated communities in Hampshire County, West Virginia
Unincorporated communities in Morgan County, West Virginia
Unincorporated communities in West Virginia